Huasco Province is one of three provinces of the northern Chilean region of Atacama (III). Vallenar is the capital city.

Geography and demography
The province had a 2002 population of 66,491 Of these, 53,664 (80.7%) lived in urban areas and 12,827 (19.3%) in rural areas. Between the 1992 and 2002 censuses, the population grew by 2.7% (1,761 persons).

Administration
As a province, Huasco is a second-level administrative division of Chile, which is further divided into four communes (comunas). The province is administered by a presidentially appointed provincial delegate. Rodrigo Loyola Morenilla was appointed by president Gabriel Boric.

Communes
Vallenar
Freirina
Huasco
Alto del Carmen

References

Provinces of Atacama Region
Provinces of Chile